Duncan McIntyre  (23 December 1834 – 13 June 1894) was a Scots-Quebecer businessman from Callander noted for his participation in the Canadian Pacific Railway syndicate of 1880 and as a founder of the Bell Telephone Company of Canada.

The Canada Central Railway was owned by McIntyre who amalgamated it with the CPR and became one of the handful of officers of the newly formed CPR. The CCR started in Brockville and extended to Pembroke. It then followed a westward route along the Ottawa River passing through places like Cobden, Deux Rivieres and eventually to Mattawa at the confluence of the Mattawa and Ottawa Rivers. It then proceeded cross-country towards its final destination, Callander.

McIntyre and his contractor James Worthington led the CCR expansion. Worthington remained with the CPR for about a year until he left the company. McIntyre's nephew, John Ferguson, staked out the future North Bay, Ontario after getting assurance from his uncle and Worthington that it would be the divisional point and a location of some importance.

The CPR started its westward expansion from Bonfield, Ontario (previously called Callander Station) where the first spike was driven into a sunken railway tie. Bonfield, Ontario was inducted into Canadian Railway Hall of Fame in 2002 as the CPR First Spike location. That was the point where the Canada Central Railway extension ended.

Family
He married Jane Allan Cassils and they were the parents of four sons and three daughters,

William McIntyre
John McIntyre
Duncan McIntyre
Charles McIntyre
Mary Fisher McIntyre. She married her first cousin, Archibald Arthur Hodgson (1869-1960), one of the five well-known sons of Jonathan Hodgson (1827-1914) and Margaret Cassils. Their son, Duncan, married Hylda, daughter of J. K. L. Ross, of Montreal.
Margaret McIntyre, married R. Archibald Snowball, of Chatham, New Brunswick. He was a younger son of The Hon. Jabez Bunting Snowball, Lieutenant Governor of New Brunswick. Their only child, Robbie, died unmarried at Montreal.
Jane McIntyre, married Lewis Reford, son of Robert Wilson Reford (1831-1913).

Residence

In the 1880s, McIntyre commissioned architect William Thomas to design a residence for him on a ten-acre plot within the Golden Square Mile. Known as Craguie, the mansion was demolished in 1930. In 1947, his family donated the land to McGill University, for an area known as McIntyre Park. In 1965, the university completed construction of the McIntyre Medical Sciences Building, named in his honour. The McIntyre site is also home to the Stewart Biological Sciences Building.

References

External links 

Biography at the Dictionary of Canadian Biography Online
Photograph: Duncan McIntyre in 1862. McCord Museum
Photograph: Duncan McIntyre in 1880. McCord Museum
Photograph: Duncan McIntyre in 1891. McCord Museum

Businesspeople from Montreal
Pre-Confederation Quebec people
Pre-Confederation Canadian businesspeople
Scottish emigrants to pre-Confederation Quebec
People from Stirling (council area)
1834 births
1894 deaths
Canadian Pacific Railway people
Burials at Mount Royal Cemetery